This is the filmography of Major Sundarrajan, an Indian actor and director who worked primarily in Tamil films.

Partial filmography

As actor

As director

As dubbing artist

References 

Indian filmographies
Male actor filmographies